Pseuderesia is a genus of butterflies in the family Lycaenidae. The species of this genus are  endemic to the Afrotropics. The genus Eresiomera is sometimes treated as a synonym of Pseuderesia.

Species
Pseuderesia eleaza  (Hewitson, 1873)
Pseuderesia mapongua (Holland, 1893)
Pseuderesia vidua  Talbot, 1937

References

Poritiinae
Lycaenidae genera
Taxa named by Arthur Gardiner Butler